Gary Zauner (born November 2, 1950) is an American football coach who most recently served as the special teams coordinator for the California Redwoods of the United Football League.

Previously, he had coached 13 seasons in the National Football League (NFL) with the Minnesota Vikings, Baltimore Ravens and Arizona Cardinals. He has coached kickers for over 35 years in high school, college and the NFL. Further, he was a successful college kicker playing for the University of Wisconsin–La Crosse.

Zauner also operates a kicking consulting service located in Fountain Hills, Arizona.

Playing career
Zauner was a four-year letterman in football and baseball at University of Wisconsin–La Crosse (1968–72). He went to training camp as a punter with the Minnesota Vikings in 1973 and the Houston Oilers in 1974.

College coaching career
Zauner began his coaching career in 1979 at Brigham Young University under Head Coach LaVell Edwards. He became the first full-time special teams coach in the NCAA. At BYU he recruited punter/kicker Lee Johnson, a future fifth-round draft choice by the Houston Oilers in 1985.

He then moved to coach special teams at San Diego State for five Seasons (1981–85) turning the Aztecs into one of the best special teams units in the nation. At SDSU, he helped to recruit current Redwoods defensive assistant coach and longtime NFL safety Robert Griffith.

Zauner spent the following three seasons (1987–89) at the University of New Mexico where he coached former NFL wide receiver Terance Mathis, who tied an NCAA season record (1989) for three
touchdown’s on kickoff returns.

In 1990, Zauner was hired by George Allen to coach at Long Beach State for two seasons (1990–91).

Personal life
Zauner attended Hamilton High School. He earned bachelor's and master's degrees in physical education from University of Wisconsin–La Crosse.

References

External links
Official website

1950 births
Living people
Sportspeople from Milwaukee
Minnesota Vikings coaches
Baltimore Ravens coaches
Arizona Cardinals coaches
Sacramento Mountain Lions coaches